Mykhaylo Mykolayovych Serhiychuk (born 29 July 1991) is a Ukrainian professional footballer who plays as a striker.

Career

Early years
He is a product of KOLIPS-Shturm Kostopil sportive school.

Mykolaiv
Serhiychuk spent time with different Ukrainian teams that played in the Ukrainian Second League and was promoted to the Ukrainian First League as player of his new club Mykolaiv in 2013.

Desna Chernihiv
In January 2019 he moved from Vorskla Poltava to Desna Chernihiv.

Ventspils
In the summer of 2019 he moved to Ventspils.

Veres Rivne
On 29 August 2021 he scored against Desna Chernihiv in the Ukrainian Premier League at the Chernihiv Stadium. He was chosen player of the round 6 of the 2021–22 Ukrainian Premier League. On 1 December 2022 his contract with the club was terminated.

Bukovyna Chernivtsi
In March 2023 he signed for Bukovyna Chernivtsi.

Honours

Club
Veres Rivne
 Ukrainian First League: (2) 2020–21, 2016–17

Nyva Vinnytsia
 Ukrainian Second League: 2009–10

Individual
 Ukrainian Premier League Player of the Round: Round 6

References

External links
 
 

1991 births
Living people
Ukrainian footballers
Ukrainian expatriate footballers
Association football forwards
NK Veres Rivne players
FC Nyva Vinnytsia players
MFC Mykolaiv players
FC Cherkashchyna players
FC Karpaty Lviv players
Ukrainian Premier League players
Ukrainian First League players
Ukrainian Second League players
Ukrainian Amateur Football Championship players
FC Hoverla Uzhhorod players
FC Olimpik Donetsk players
FC Vorskla Poltava players
FC Desna Chernihiv players
FK Ventspils players
Latvian Higher League players
Expatriate footballers in Latvia
Ukrainian expatriate sportspeople in Latvia
Sportspeople from Rivne Oblast